Allen Paul or Alan Paul may refer to:

Allen Paul (writer), American author, reporter and political speech writer
Allen Paul (politician) (born 1945), Republican member of the Indiana Senate
Alan Paul, a singer/composer
Alan Paul (author)

See also 

Paul Allen (disambiguation)